Chang Yuan is a Chinese amateur boxer.

References

1997 births
Living people
Chinese women boxers
Boxers at the 2020 Summer Olympics
Olympic boxers of China
Asian Games gold medalists for China
Boxers at the 2018 Asian Games
Asian Games medalists in boxing
Medalists at the 2018 Asian Games
Boxers at the 2014 Summer Youth Olympics
Youth Olympic gold medalists for China
Sportspeople from Shijiazhuang
21st-century Chinese women